Dino De Martin (1 February 1921 – 31 July 1960) was an Italian bobsledder who competed in the late 1950s. He finished fifth in the four-man event at the 1956 Winter Olympics in Cortina d'Ampezzo. He died in Lignano Sabbiadoro on 31 July 1960, at the age of 39.

References

1921 births
1960 deaths
Bobsledders at the 1956 Winter Olympics
Italian male bobsledders
Olympic bobsledders of Italy